Ariel Gustavo Pereyra (born 2 October 1973) is an Argentine retired footballer that played as centre back. He played more than of 200 games at the Argentine Primera División and his last club was Unión La Calera.

Pereyra began his football career at Gimnasia de La Plata youth ranks at a very young age, being after promoted to the first adult team in the 1992–93 season, making his official debut against Belgrano in a 1–1 draw. After nine years in that club, in 2002, he joined to Colón de Santa Fe and then to Argentine powerhouse San Lorenzo de Almagro, two years later.

In January 2007, Pereyra moved to Chilean Primera División club Huachipato, playing the Apertura Tournament, in where his team qualified to the Copa Sudamericana of that year, being immediately eliminated by Colo-Colo. After of fail to play the Clausura Tournament, he joined to Primera B side of the same country, Unión La Calera, in where he finished his football career, after of play just 15 games in the second tier tournament.

After of his retirement, Pereyra accepted the work of be the coach of the youth ranks of his former club Gimnasia de La Plata, declaring also that he wants direct the first adult team of Primera División.

References

External links
 Pereyra at Football Lineups
 Argentine Primera statistics

1973 births
Living people
Argentine footballers
Argentine expatriate footballers
Argentine Primera División players
Club de Gimnasia y Esgrima La Plata footballers
Club Atlético Colón footballers
San Lorenzo de Almagro footballers
Chilean Primera División players
Primera B de Chile players
C.D. Huachipato footballers
Unión La Calera footballers
Expatriate footballers in Chile
People from Berazategui Partido
Association football defenders
Sportspeople from Buenos Aires Province